Marshwood is a village and civil parish in west Dorset, England, situated on the northern edge of the Marshwood Vale approximately  northeast of Lyme Regis. Dorset County Council estimate that the parish had a population of 310 in 2013. Figures published from the 2011 census are for Marshwood parish combined with the small neighbouring parish of Bettiscombe: the combined population was 346.

The village school was opened in 1842 and covers the catchment areas of Marshwood, Pilsdon, Bettiscombe, and Blackdown Ward of Broadwindsor. Secondary education is provided at Woodroffe School, Lyme Regis. The church of St Mary's was built in 1840-41 and underwent a rebuild in 1883–84.

The Bottle Inn on the outskirts of Marshwood is home to the world stinging nettle eating championships. It is also the 2016 Regional (Dorset, Hampshire, Wiltshire & the Channel Islands) CAMRA winner for its range & quality of ciders & ales.

Notable residents
Peter De Greef (1922-1980), actor resident in the village for many years and buried in the church yard of St Mary's church

Notes

External links

Parish Church of St Mary

Villages in Dorset